Rajasthan Oriental Research Institute is an organisation established by Government of Rajasthan to promote Rajasthani culture and heritage and to accumulate and maintain the old Rajansthani folk art work and folk literature. It was established in 1954 under guidance of Muni Jinvijayaji, a member of the Royal Asiatic Society. Dr. Rajendra Prasad laid foundation stone in 1955 and it opened on 14 September 1958. The institute's headquarters is in Jodhpur.

The institute has got a fine art gallery with  a wide collection of miniature paintings of Rajasthan. The collection also includes some calligraphy and manuscripts like Samput Phalak and Gandika. The library has a wide collection of old books and journals.

See also
 Arid Forest Research Institute (AFRI)
 Rajasthan Oriental Research Institute, de Jodhpur. Related with Research lnstitute, guru-sigya, descriptión Jodhpur (manuscrit) one hundred asanas, rules of diet, description of kanda nadl, kundalinl, knowledg the date of death and other kind of resources's control. Manuscrit has the #number 6756, size 17 cm. x 9cm, 171 pages, lines: 7-9 y 20-23 letters.

References
jodhpur district

External links
 Official website

Cultural organisations based in India
Museums in Rajasthan
Folk art museums and galleries in India
Organisations based in Jodhpur
Archives in India
State agencies of Rajasthan
Tourist attractions in Jodhpur
Rajasthani folklore
1954 establishments in Rajasthan
Research institutes established in 1954